Florø Sportsklubb is a Norwegian sports club from the town of Florø in the municipality of Kinn, Vestland, Norway. It has sections for association football, team handball and swimming.

The club was founded in 1912 as Florø FK. Florø FK was later incorporated into Florø-Varg, founded in 1929. In 1945 Florø-Varg merged with Atgeir, a worker's football club founded in 1931, to form Florø SK.

Men's football
Florø Stadion is their home field. Their team colors are blue and black.

History
The men's football team currently plays in the 3. divisjon, the fourth tier of the Norwegian football league system. Florø was relegated to the 4. divisjon (fifth tier) in 2005, and promoted back to 3. divisjon in the following 2006 season. They played in 3. divisjon from 2007 to their promotion from the 2013 3. divisjon. In 2014, 2015 and 2016, the team played in the 2. divisjon. Florø won their group in the 2016 2. divisjon and was promoted to the 2017 1. divisjon where they finished in 8th position. In 2018, they were relegated to the 2. divisjon.

Recent history
{|class="wikitable"
|-bgcolor="#efefef"
! Season
! 
! Pos.
! Pl.
! W
! D
! L
! GS
! GA
! P
!Cup
!Notes
|-
|2001
|2. divisjon
|align=right bgcolor="#FFCCCC"| 13
|align=right|26||align=right|4||align=right|5||align=right|17
|align=right|32||align=right|69||align=right|17
|1st round
|Relegated
|-
|2002
|3. divisjon
|align=right |8
|align=right|22||align=right|9||align=right|3||align=right|10
|align=right|41||align=right|42||align=right|30
|
|
|-
|2003
|3. divisjon
|align=right |7
|align=right|22||align=right|7||align=right|4||align=right|11
|align=right|43||align=right|56||align=right|25
|―
|
|-
|2004
|3. divisjon
|align=right |9
|align=right|22||align=right|6||align=right|4||align=right|12
|align=right|33||align=right|58||align=right|22
|―
|
|-
|2005
|3. divisjon
|align=right bgcolor="#FFCCCC"| 12
|align=right|22||align=right|2||align=right|5||align=right|15
|align=right|28||align=right|57||align=right|11
|2nd qualifying round
|Relegated
|-
|2006
|4. divisjon
|align=right bgcolor=#DDFFDD| 1
|align=right|16||align=right|14||align=right|1||align=right|1
|align=right|66||align=right|16||align=right|43
|―
|Promoted
|-
|2007
|3. divisjon
|align=right |6
|align=right|22||align=right|10||align=right|2||align=right|10
|align=right|50||align=right|57||align=right|32
|―
|
|-
|2008
|3. divisjon
|align=right |7
|align=right|22||align=right|8||align=right|5||align=right|9
|align=right|34||align=right|48||align=right|29
|1st qualifying round
|
|-
|2009
|3. divisjon
|align=right |10
|align=right|22||align=right|6||align=right|3||align=right|13
|align=right|36||align=right|70||align=right|21
|2nd qualifying round
|
|-
|2010
|3. divisjon
|align=right |6
|align=right|22||align=right|9||align=right|5||align=right|8
|align=right|30||align=right|40||align=right|32
|1st qualifying round||
|-
|2011
|3. divisjon
|align=right |11
|align=right|26||align=right|10||align=right|3||align=right|13
|align=right|51||align=right|49||align=right|33
|1st qualifying round
|
|-
|2012
|3. divisjon
|align=right |2
|align=right|26||align=right|17||align=right|3||align=right|6
|align=right|74||align=right|35||align=right|54
|2nd round
|
|-
|2013
|3. divisjon
|align=right bgcolor=#DDFFDD| 1
|align=right|24||align=right|19||align=right|4||align=right|1
|align=right|89||align=right|26||align=right|61
|2nd round
|Promoted
|-
|2014
|2. divisjon
|align=right|6
|align=right|26||align=right|9||align=right|10||align=right|7
|align=right|53||align=right|49||align=right|37
|3rd round
|
|-
|2015
|2. divisjon
|align=right |6
|align=right|26||align=right|11||align=right|6||align=right|9
|align=right|43||align=right|32||align=right|39
|1st round
|
|-
|2016 
|2. divisjon
|align=right bgcolor=#DDFFDD| 1
|align=right|26||align=right|21||align=right|4||align=right|1
|align=right|78||align=right|22||align=right|67
|1st round
|Promoted
|-
|2017 
|1. divisjon
|align=right |8
|align=right|30||align=right|10||align=right|8||align=right|12
|align=right|42||align=right|46||align=right|38
|4th round
|
|-
|2018 
|1. divisjon
|align=right bgcolor="#FFCCCC"| 15
|align=right|30||align=right|8||align=right|3||align=right|19
|align=right|27||align=right|59||align=right|27
|2nd round
|Relegated
|-
|2019 
|2. divisjon
|align=right |7
|align=right|26||align=right|9||align=right|8||align=right|9
|align=right|36||align=right|41||align=right|35
|2nd round
|
|-
|2020 
|2. divisjon
|align=right |10
|align=right|13||align=right|4||align=right|2||align=right|7
|align=right|26||align=right|25||align=right|14
|Cancelled
|
|-
|2021
|2. divisjon
|align=right bgcolor="#FFCCCC"| 12
|align=right|26||align=right|5||align=right|3||align=right|18
|align=right|29||align=right|63||align=right|18
|2nd round
|Relegated
|-
|2022
|3. divisjon
|align=right|4
|align=right|26||align=right|15||align=right|4||align=right|7
|align=right|53||align=right|27||align=right|49
|1st round
|
|}
Source:

Current squad

Florø SK2
In some seasons, a reserve squad, Florø SK2, has been one of the Norwegian reserve football teams to compete in the lower tiers of the Norwegian football league system. While Florø SK2 competed in the 2019 4. divisjon (fifth-level of Norwegian football), as of December 2020, the reserve club's page on the Florø SK official website is blank.

References

External links
 Official site 

Football clubs in Norway
Sport in Sogn og Fjordane
Association football clubs established in 1912
Kinn
1912 establishments in Norway